Rock Hill Farms is a single barrel bourbon whiskey produced in Frankfort, Kentucky, by the Sazerac Company. The brand is sold as a straight bourbon. It comes from Buffalo Trace Distillery's mash bill #2. Similar Buffalo Trace Distillery bourbons that come from mash bill #2 are Elmer T. Lee, Ancient Age, and Blanton's.
Rock Hill Farms is sold in glass in 750ml bottles.

References

External links
 Official site for Rock Hill Farms
 Official site for Buffalo Trace

Bourbon whiskey
Sazerac Company brands